Gina de Araujo Régis de Oliveira (April 3, 1890 – 1960) was a Brazilian composer and singer.

Born in Rio de Janeiro, Araujo traveled to Paris to study voice; her teachers there included Jules Massenet, Jean de Reszke, and André Gedalge. As a composer she wrote piano pieces and songs, as well as some larger-scale works for orchestra. She was married to the diplomat , upon whose death she composed a requiem mass. She died in the city of her birth.

References

1890 births
1960 deaths
Brazilian classical composers
Brazilian women composers
Women classical composers
20th-century classical composers
20th-century Brazilian women singers
20th-century Brazilian singers
Musicians from Rio de Janeiro (city)
Pupils of Jules Massenet
20th-century women composers